Stefan Lukic (born 1 June 1996) is a Serbian footballer who plays as a midfielder for Northern Colorado Hailstorm in USL League One.

Career

Youth
Lukic was recruited to play with Partizan when he was just 11-year's old. Lukic spent nine of his eleven years at Partizan as captain of the club's various age-group sides. As a youth player, Lukic was linked to top European teams and was close to joining Everton, but the deal collapsed.

College & Amateur
In 2017, Lukic moved to the United States to play college soccer at Oklahoma Wesleyan University. During his five seasons with the Eagles, including a truncated 2020 season due to the COVID-19 pandemic, Lukic went on appear in 112 matches, scoring 62 goals and tallying 93 assists as one of the Eagles' best all-time scorers. Lukic helped the Eagles reach the NAIA national tournament Final Four in multiple years, earned NAIA First-Team All-America honors every year between 2018 and 2021, the Kansas Collegiate Athletic Conference MVP four times, and was the 2019 NAIA Men’s Soccer National Player of the Year.

In both 2018 and 2019, Lukic played in the USL League Two with Corpus Christi FC, scoring nine goals in 21 regular season appearances over two seasons.

Professional
On 1 February 2022, Luckic signed his first professional contract, joining USL League One club Northern Colorado Hailstorm ahead of their inaugural season. He debuted for the club on 6 April 2022, starting in a Lamar Hunt U.S. Open Cup game against Colorado Springs Switchbacks.

References

1996 births
Association football midfielders
Corpus Christi FC players
Expatriate soccer players in the United States
Living people
Northern Colorado Hailstorm FC players
Serbian expatriate footballers
Serbian expatriate sportspeople in the United States
Serbian footballers
USL League One players
USL League Two players